Zhengyi or Zheng Yi (Wade–Giles: Cheng I) may refer to:

 Zhengyi Dao, a Daoist movement founded by Zhang Daoling
 Zhengyi, a lich character from Dungeons & Dragons
 Zheng Yi (author) (born 1947), of Scarlet Memorial: Tales of Cannibalism in Modern China
 Zheng Yi (pirate) (1765–1807), a Chinese pirate of the South China Sea

See also
Cheng Yi (disambiguation)